Hugh Martin (11 August 1822 – 14 June 1885) was a Scottish minister of the Free Church of Scotland and theological author.

Life

He was born in Aberdeen on 11 August 1822 the son of Alexander Martin, a clothier and haberdasher living at 79 Gallowgate. He was educated at Aberdeen Grammar School then took an arts degree at Marischal College graduating with an MA in 1839. He then took a second degree in Theology at King's College, Aberdeen.

In 1842 he was converted to the principles of the Free Church of Scotland by Rev Dr William Cunningham who became a life-long mentor. In the Disruption of 1843 he joined the Free Church faction and was one of the first ministers ordained directly into that faction without transfer from the Church of Scotland. Licensed to preach by the Free Church in 1843 he was thereafter ordained as minister of Panbride near Carnoustie.

In 1858 he left Panbride to take on the role as minister of Greyfriars Free Church in Edinburgh (on West Crosscauseway), one of the Free Church's newly built and more impressive city monuments. He lived in a villa on Findhorn Place.

He retired to Lasswade south of Edinburgh in 1865 due to ill-health. However he continued to lecture at the University of Edinburgh, and in 1872 the University awarded him an honorary doctorate DD. In his retiral he spent much effort in campaigning for free education for all children in Scotland, and was one of the non-political forces who brought about the 1872 Education Act in Scotland.

He died in Lasswade on 14 June 1885. He is buried with his family in Grange Cemetery in south Edinburgh. The grave lies in the north-west section.

Publications

Christ's Presence in the Gospel History (1860)
The Prophet Jonah (1866)
A Study of Trilinear Co-ordinates (1867) - mathematics
Simon Peter (1869)
The Atonement (1870)
National Education 8 volumes (1872)
Mutual Eligibility 8 volumes (1872)
Relationships Between Christ's Headship over Church and State (1875)
The Shadow of Calvary 8 volumes (1875)
The Westminster Doctrine of the Inspiration of Scripture 8 volumes (1877)

Family

He was married to Elizabeth Jane Robertson (1828-1895). Six daughters are recorded on his gravestone  and his son Alexander was Principal of New College, Edinburgh 1918-1935 and one of the architects of the union of the United Free Church of Scotland and Church of Scotland in 1929.

References

1822 births
1885 deaths
Clergy from Aberdeen
Alumni of the University of Aberdeen
19th-century Ministers of the Free Church of Scotland
Academics of the University of Edinburgh